Wild is a one-hour American documentary television series that premiered in 2006 on the National Geographic Channel.

References

External links
Official website

National Geographic (American TV channel) original programming
2000s American documentary television series
2010s American documentary television series
2000s American reality television series
2010s American reality television series
2006 American television series debuts